{{DISPLAYTITLE:C8H11NO3}}
The molecular formula C8H11NO3 (molar mass:  169.17 g/mol, exact mass: 169.073893 u) may refer to:

 Norepinephrine, or noradrenaline
 Oxidopamine, a dopamine derivative
 Pyridoxine